The 2018–19 season is West Bromwich Albion's first season in the Championship since 2009–10 and their 141st year in existence. In this season the club participated in the Championship, FA Cup and League Cup. On 18 May 2018, caretaker manager and former player Darren Moore was given the permanent job, after earning 11 points from 6 games in the previous season. He was sacked on 9 March 2019, despite the club sitting fourth in the table, a series of poor results forced the board to make the decision and the club 'will always hold Darren in such high regard'. First team coach James Shan took over as caretaker manager, who has been working for the club academy from  under-7s age group all the way to under-23s.

They lost to local rivals Aston Villa on penalties in the play-offs semi-final on 14 May, failing to make an immediate return to the Premier League.

The season covers the period from 1 July 2018 to 30 June 2019, with competitive matches played between August and May.

Background
Albion unveiled new kits for the season, manufactured by Puma. The home kit featured the team's traditional navy blue and white vertical striped shirts, white shorts and white socks. The wide vertical stripes on the jersey and italic WBA lettering on the socks were designed as a tribute to the club's "iconic" kit of the late 1970s. Two change kits were produced, which the club intended to be worn "as much as possible in equal measure" throughout the season. One of the change kits featured yellow and green stripes, while an alternative change kit had a black and cyan design. The goalkeeper kit was black with grey trim at home and purple for away matches. Ideal Boilers were the club's main shirt sponsor, in the first year of a two-year deal; this led to the introduction of a new mascot, a combi boiler character nicknamed "Boiler Man" by fans, though "Baggie Bird" remained Albion's main mascot. 10Bet provided secondary shirt sponsorship worth £1million.

Graeme Jones left his position with the Belgium national team to join Albion as assistant head coach.

Immediately prior to the start of the season, most bookmakers listed Albion as second favourites (behind Stoke City) to win promotion, quoting odds of promotion between 2/1 and 10/3. Odds of the club being relegated were between 22/1 and 40/1.

First team

Competitions

Pre-season
Albion faced Barnet, Swindon Town, Aberdeen, Barnsley and Coventry City in pre-season friendly matches.

Championship

West Bromwich Albion will compete in the 2018–19 EFL Championship, the third season of English football's second division under the EFL Championship name. It was Albion's first season back in the Championship following the club's relegation from the Premier League in 2017–18, their 39th season in the second tier of English football and their 120th season of league football in all. West Brom's provisional fixture list was announced on 21 June 2018, but a number of matches were subsequently rescheduled for live broadcast on Sky Sports. The away matches at Middlesbrough, Birmingham City, Ipswich Town and Sheffield United, as well as the home match against Aston Villa, were moved from a Saturday afternoon to the preceding Friday night. The home games versus Leeds United and Brentford were also moved from Saturday afternoon, the former to a Saturday early evening kickoff and the latter to Monday night. The away games at Nottingham Forest and Sheffield Wednesday and the home match against Derby County were televised by Sky Sports on their originally scheduled dates, with the Derby game changed to an 8pm kickoff. In addition, all midweek games were made available live via the red button.

League table

Results summary

Results by matchday

Matches

Play-offs

FA Cup

EFL Cup

Transfers

Transfers in

Transfers out

Loans in

Loans out

Squad statistics

|-
!colspan=15|Player(s) out on loan

|-
!colspan=15|Players who left the club during the season

|}

Goals record

Disciplinary record

References

West Bromwich Albion
West Bromwich Albion F.C. seasons